Beaverdam is a small unincorporated community in Hanover County in the central region of the U.S. state of Virginia. The community was named after the beaver dams in the area.

It is the location of four historic locations listed on the National Register of Historic Places: Scotchtown, a residence of Patrick Henry, the Beaverdam Depot, Dewberry, and Trinity Church.  It was also the childhood home of Thomas Nelson Page, a notable author and American diplomat in the 20th century.
Consisting primarily of farmland, today it is an outlying suburb of Richmond. The railroad still passes through, operated by the Buckingham Branch Railroad, a Virginia-based short line railroad.

Beaverdam Elementary School of Hanover County Public Schools celebrated their centennial anniversary in 2006.

The former New York Jet, Damien Woody, lives here.

U. S. Racing Hall of Fame jockey Ted Atkinson (1916-2005) made his home in Beaverdam.

References

External links
Hanover County Economic Development

Unincorporated communities in Hanover County, Virginia
Unincorporated communities in Virginia
Suburbs of Richmond, Virginia